G-class submarine may refer to:

 British G-class submarine
 Spanish G-class submarine, locally produced German Type VIIC-class submarines, see Spanish submarine G-7
 United States G-class submarine